Santa Catalina School is a private school in California founded by Sister Margaret Thompson and the Dominican Order in 1950. Situated on a 36-acre hacienda-style campus, the Upper School is an all-girls boarding school which also accepts local students. The Lower and Middle School serves both boys and girls (preschool through 8th grade). Students are required to wear uniforms. The school emphasizes building a sense of community that challenges its students mentally and spiritually. Santa Catalina is accredited by the California Association of Independent Schools and the Western Association of Schools and Colleges. In addition, the school is associated with the National Association of Independent Schools, the Association of Boarding Schools, National Catholic Educational Association, and the National Coalition of Girls' Schools.

History

Ranch beginnings and religious background
The original Santa Catalina Convent was founded by Sister Marie Geomaere, a Dominican sister, in what is now downtown Monterey in 1850, when Monterey was the capital of California. With the help of Rev. Joseph Alemany, O.P., Bishop of Monterey, she created the first Catholic school in California, excluding mission schools. Students were predominantly daughters of local town residents and of nearby Spanish landowners and classes were taught in Castilian Spanish. In 1854 the school was moved to Benicia, the new state capital, where it was renamed St. Catherine's Academy.

In 1950, Sister Margaret Thompson, Mother General of the Dominican Sisters of San Rafael, California, decided to reestablish Santa Catalina in Monterey. After buying the 36-acre campus from a local cattle rancher, Col. Harold Mack, the school opened in the fall of 1950, with Sister Mary Kieran as the first principal. When Sister Kieran died in 1965, Sister Carlotta became principal, a title she held for 35 years. As principal, Sister Carlotta's goal was to "educate the whole child... by guiding young people toward intellectual attainment and social, physical, and spiritual well-being."

Transition to co-education and new leadership
Boys were allowed to enroll in preschool and kindergarten at the request of Sister Jean, and Sister Carlotta encouraged male students to continue their education at the school through 8th grade.

Sister Claire, after serving as Head of Upper School since 1982, became Head of School in 2002. Sister Claire and Sister Christine still reside on campus, though both are now retired.

Margaret K. Bradley became Head of School in 2016 upon the retirement of Sister Claire. Margaret Bradley retired in June 2022. Upon her retirement, Dr. Barbara Ostos became the fifth Head of School.

Current statistics

Lower and Middle School

Enrollment
There are 238 students in the Lower and Middle School; 61 percent are girls and 39 percent are boys.

Class size and student-teacher ratio
Class sizes are generally small, but vary by grade level as follows:

Tuition
Tuition varies by grade level, and the school offers need-based financial aid. Below is tuition and financial aid information for the 2010-2011 school year.
 Pre-K: $14,500
 Kindergarten: $22,750
 Grades 1-8: $24,750
 42 percent of students receive financial aid.

Upper School

Enrollment, class size, and student-teacher ratio
As of August 2019, there were 216 girls enrolled at Santa Catalina: 113 were boarding students and 103 were day students. International students made up 19% of the student body. The average class size was 12 students, and the student-teacher ratio was 8:1.

Tuition
Upper School tuition varies between resident and day students, and both need and merit-based financial aid are offered.
 Boarding: $59,000 for the 2019-20 school year
 Day: $38,250 for the 2019-20 school year
 42% of students received financial aid for the 2019-20 school year.

Education and academics

Mission
Santa Catalina Lower and Middle School "encourage[s] each boy and girl to work effectively, to communicate articulately, [and] to approach life with a sense of purpose and competence" and prepares students for secondary schooling.

Santa Catalina School aims to "combine a rigorous liberal arts curriculum, modern educational technology, and solid Christian principles" to prepare its students for college and beyond. The single-sex environment, Catholic background, and college preparatory courses are emphasized to "teach the importance of becoming leaders in our communities by serving others." The school attempts to develop each girl's abilities and emphasizes balancing intellectual growth with spiritual awareness. Santa Catalina also seeks diversity in order to enhance a student's sense of responsibility to her community and herself.

Requirements

 4 years of English
 3 years of math, foreign language, religious studies, lab sciences, and arts
 Extracurricular activities are required for each of the three athletic seasons. Students have a choice each season between sports, performing arts (theater, dance, and music), and physical education.

Admission
Santa Catalina accepts students on the basis of academic achievement and personal qualification "without regard to race, creed, color, or national and ethnic origins." The admissions office requires a questionnaire and writing sample, school transcript, teacher recommendations, parent statements, SSAT scores, an interview, and an optional personal recommendation. Non-native English speakers are required to take the TOEFL.

Departments
Academics are divided among the following departments: Art, Drama, English, Foreign Language (including French, Spanish, and Mandarin Chinese), History, Math, Music, Religion, and Science.

Honors and AP opportunities
Santa Catalina School offers 11 AP (Advanced Placement) and 7 Advanced Topics courses.

College counseling and acceptance
The school has two college counselors on campus who work closely with seniors and assist with students' college applications and SAT and ACT registration. In addition, the school has an online resource for students called Naviance, which provides further college counseling. In addition, approximately 65 colleges and universities from within the United States and abroad send representatives to Catalina to discuss their schools with students throughout the academic year. The average SAT score of students is 1732. 100% of graduates attend college and within the past five years the most-attended colleges were UC Davis (20 students), UCLA (11 students), Boston University (11 students), New York University (9 students), and Loyola Marymount University (9 students).

Lower and Middle School academics
From kindergarten to fifth grade, students take courses in art, computer studies, language arts, math, music, physical education, religion, science, and social science. Spanish classes are introduced in the 4th grade. In grades 6 – 8, students take classes in art, computer science, English, foreign language (Spanish), history, math, music, physical education, religion, and science.

Faculty and administrators
Despite the school's religious background, the current administrators are laypeople and not affiliated with a religious order.

 Head of School - Margaret K. "Meg" Bradley
 Assistant Head of School - John Aime
 Assistant Head of School for Mission and Identity - John Murphy, Ph.D.
 Head of Upper School - Julie Lenherr Edson ’88
 Head of Lower and Middle School, PreK–Grade 8 - Christy Pollacci

The Upper School is ranked among the top 20 boarding schools for faculty education because a high percentage of the faculty has advanced degrees.

Facilities

 Aquatic center
In 2003 a new outdoor aquatic center was completed, featuring a 25 yard by 30 meter pool that is connected to the gym's locker rooms. This 10 lane pool is used for physical education classes and the Upper School's swimming and diving and water polo teams. The pool was renovated beginning in 2018 and was unveiled for the second time in the spring of 2019. It is now fully functional.

Bedford Family Gymnasium Complex
Located next to the pool, the gym houses basketball and volleyball courts, bleachers, and dressing room facilities. PE classes and Upper and Lower School basketball and volleyball teams use the facility. The gym overlooks the pool and a regulation size softball and soccer field, which is encircled by an all-weather track. In addition, the gym is adjacent to 6 regulation size tennis courts, including one lighted court with stadium seating.

Dormitories
Resident students live in one of three dorms in either a single or double room, with faculty members living on each floor. Each room has a bed, desk, drawers, and lockable closet and there are common bathrooms for each floor. The dorms also come "equipped" with wireless internet, laundry facilities, and vending machines.

Thompson Dormitory — This dorm is used primarily for freshman and some sophomores, and also has faculty housing.

Greer Family Dormitory — This is the newest dorm and houses sophomores, juniors, and faculty.

Hills Hall — For seniors and faculty.

The Hacienda
Originally the Upper School classroom building, this 70-year-old building now houses the Upper School Admissions Office, Business Office, and Development Office.

 Mary L Johnson Music Center
This building houses a 150-seat recital hall, a dance studio, and music studios for private lessons. The building is primarily used for student music lessons and recitals.

 Rosary Chapel
The chapel is located in the center of campus and was built in 1954 as a donation from by Mrs. Marcia Ferrell Hart. San Francisco architect Germano Milono was commissioned to design the building. One of the most notable features is the chapel's stained glass windows. Today the chapel is used for weekly morning prayer offered for all students and faculty, weekly masses for resident students, on-campus faculty, and the public, as well as special events.

Santo Domingo Hall
This building includes the student health center and the dining hall. The school uses Bon Appétit food services, who were the winners of the National Resource Defense Council's 2009 Growing Green Award for their commitment to sustainable food. Their menus often feature locally grown foods and leftovers are composted. Although their vegetarian and vegan options are often limited to the daily salad bar.

Sister Mary Kieran Memorial Library
Finished in 1967, the library holds about 34,000 volumes, 40 in-house periodicals, 500 media items, online databases, and 30 computers for students and teachers. It is used by both Upper and Lower Schools. The library staff are inconstant, and although the library is the only place with low volume and adequate couch space, rules constitute no napping.

Sister Carlotta Performing Arts Center
The Performing Arts Center is a 500-seat, state of the art theater that is used for Lower School Spring and Christmas concerts, various recitals, and three Upper School performances every academic year. The Performing Arts Center also hosts the B.R.E.A.L. show (a performance put on by the student-run performing arts clubs) and Evening of the Arts (an arts showcase at the end of the year).

Study Hall
Upper School assembly is conducted every morning in this building. Desks are provided for every student and are arranged by class. There are also a limited number of lockers available for student use. Because of the small size of the lockers, the difficulty in reaching them, and the limited number, students prefer open crates under their desks.

Student life

Athletics

Middle school
Competitive sports are offered, but not required, for students in grades 6 - 8. Teams compete by grade level with other public and private schools in the area.

Upper School
Students can choose to participate in one sport per season. Teams compete in the Pacific Coast Athletic League (PCAL) and the CIF / Central Coast Section (CCS). The volleyball, basketball, tennis, soccer, water polo, lacrosse, field hockey, and softball teams compete at both the varsity and junior varsity levels.

Performing arts
Students may also participate in theatre or dance, rather than athletic teams, after school.

 Theatre: In addition to offering drama classes, the school presents two musicals and one drama each year, which students can choose to participate in.
 Dance: Dance classes are offered in ballet technique, jazz, contemporary, and musical-theater tap.
 Music: In addition to the required extracurricular athletics or performing arts, private musical and vocal lessons are available to students. There are also school-wide recitals and a school choir.

Community service

 Upper School - Each class has a day designated for mandatory community service. Students choose between the following sites: Dorothy's Place, St. Vincent de Paul Thrift Store, Salvation Army Youth Center, Ave Maria Convalescent Center, Ag Against Hunger, Gateway Center, Harbor Project, STAR Riders, and Food Bank of Monterey County. Certain sites are also offered for students two afternoons each week.
 Lower and Middle School - The entire Lower and Middle School is involved in one community service project each month.

Student clubs

Notable alumnae
 Kathleen Brown, 1994 California gubernatorial candidate; daughter of former Governor Edmund G. "Pat" Brown;  sister of former California Governor Jerry Brown
 Maryedith Burrell, film and television producer, writer, actress and documentarian
 Angelique Cabral, actress, star of CBS's Life in Pieces
 Ninive Clements Calegari, educator and co-founder of 826 Valencia, The Teacher Salary Project and Enterprise for Youth
 Leslie Cockburn, journalist, producer, director, writer; co-producer of The Peacemaker with George Clooney
 Claire Coffee, actress, star of NBC's Grimm
 Abigail Folger, coffee heiress, civil rights activist
 Sharon Gless, actress, best known for 1980s crime drama Cagney and Lacey
 Jennifer Grant, actress, daughter of Cary Grant and Dyan Cannon
 Patricia Hearst, newspaper heiress, former member of Symbionese Liberation Army
Dakota Johnson, actress, best known for her role in the Fifty Shades franchise (attended one year)
 Monica C. Lozano, publisher and CEO of the Spanish language La Opinión newspaper in Los Angeles
 Kathleen Sullivan, first woman anchor at CNN
 Brita Sigourney, three time Olympian and 2018 Bronze medalist in her specialty of skiing

References

External links

The Association of Boarding Schools profile

Catholic secondary schools in California
High schools in Monterey County, California
Catholic boarding schools in the United States
Educational institutions established in 1950
1950 establishments in California
Buildings and structures in Monterey, California
Private high schools in California
Preparatory schools in California
Dominican schools in the United States
Boarding schools in California
Girls' schools in California